The Coyote Butte Limestone (OR085) is a geologic formation in Oregon. It preserves fossils dating back to the Sakmarian to Kungurian stages of the Permian period, spanning an estimated 23 million years. The formation occurs in isolated buttes to the north; Triangulation Hill, and south; type locality and name giver Coyote Butte and Tuckers Butte, on either side of the Grindstone and Twelvemile Creeks in Crook County, Oregon.

Description 
The Coyote Butte Formation was first defined by Merriam and Berthiaume in 1943. The formation crops out in isolated buttes (Coyote & Tuckers) south and north (Triangulation Hill) of the Grindstone and Twelvemile Creeks in Crook County, central Oregon. The formation comprises an uncommonly unaltered and well-exposed set of Permian shallow marine and reefal limestones in the tectonically complex Permian present-day Pacific margin of western North America. 

The Coyote Butte Formation is represented by isolated limestone hills ( in area), of which most appear to have the same stratigraphic and biostratigraphic sequence and appear to be right-side-up. The resistant limestone blocks stand above the surrounding rocks of the "melange." The Coyote Butte Formation represents shallow-water carbonate-platform deposition and contains a varied faunal assemblage of corals, bryozoans, algae, fusulinids, brachiopods, crinoids, and conodonts.

Paleogeographic situation 
The formation is dated to the Sakmarian to Kungurian stages of the Early to Middle Permian period, spanning an estimated 23 million years from 296 to 273 Ma. During these times, what is now central Oregon, was located at the edge of Pangea in the northern paleotemperate zone, at paleolatitudes of 16-18° North.

Climate

Tectonics 

The hinterland of the carbonate platform where the Coyote Butte Limestone was deposited, was formed by the Arizonan and Utahan arid landscapes of a Pangea starting to break up. This occurred before the Sonoma orogeny was active in western North America and during the Alleghanian orogeny in eastern Laurentia and western Europe.

The 23 million year deposition coincided with impact of the Clearwater West crater, dated at 286.2 ± 2.6 million years ago.

Paleontological significance 

The formation is the only discovered Paleozoic fossiliferous formation in the state of Oregon, and comprises an uncommonly unaltered and well-exposed set of Early to Mid Permian shallow marine and reefal limestones in the tectonically complex Permian present-day Pacific margin of western North America. The formation just predates Olson's Extinction; a mass extinction that occurred  in the early Guadalupian of the Permian period and which predated the Permian–Triassic extinction event.

Fossil content 

Among others, the following fossils have been reported from the formation:

Brachiopods 

 ?Alexenia occidentalis
 Anidanthus minor
 Antiquatonia cooperi
 Calliprotonia inexpectatum
 Kochiproductus transversus
 Krotovia oregonensis
 ?Marginifera profundosulcata
 Martinia berthiaumei
 Probolionia posteroreticulata
 ?Proboscidella carinata
 Rostranteris sulcatum0
 Spiriferella pseudodraschei
 Stenoscisma cf. plicatum
 Tiramnia semiglobosa
 Yakovlevia transversa

Trilobites 

 Proetida
 Phillipsiidae
 Cummingella (Cummingella) sp.

Rostroconchia 
 Conocardiida
 Conocardiidae
 Arceodomus sphairikos

Gastropods 
 Prosobranchia
 Acteoninidae
 Acteonina permiana

Polyplacophora 
 Neoloricata
 Acutichitonidae
 Arcochiton soccus
 Homeochiton triangularis
 Gryphochitonidae
 Gryphochiton planoplata
 Lepidopleuridae
 ?Chauliochiton sp.
 Pterochiton sp.
 Strobilepidae
 Diadeloplax apiculatus

Corals 

 Cystolonsdaleia berthiaumi
 Petalaxis occidentalis
 Wilsonastraea ochocoensis
 Protowentzelella sp.

Correlations

Geologic correlations 

 Cisuralian Series
 Sakmarian formations
 Artinskian formations
 Roadian formations
 Wordian formations
 Kungurian formations
 Permian North America
 Esplanade Sandstone, Grand Canyon
 Arroyo Formation, Texas
 Road Canyon Formation, idem
 Waggoner Ranch Formation, idem
 Word Formation, idem
 Cherry Canyon Formation, New Mexico and Texas
 San Andres Formation, United States, idem
 Wellington Formation, Kansas and Oklahoma
 Orby Head Formation, Prince Edward Island
 Permian South America
 Carapacha Formation, Argentina
 Mangrullo Formation, Uruguay
 Rio Bonito Formation, Brazil
 Permian Africa
 Ganigobis Formation, Namibia
 Gai-As Formation, idem
 Huab Formation, idem
 Whitehill Formation, idem
 Permian Europe
 Tambach Formation, Germany
 Treskelodden Formation, Svalbard, Norway
 Arpinskaya Formation, Caucasus
 Gnishik Formation, idem

Faunal correlations

See also 

 List of fossiliferous stratigraphic units in Oregon
 Alsea Formation, Whitneyan fossiliferous formation in Lincoln County, Oregon
 John Day Fossil Beds National Monument, Late Eocene to Early Miocene sequence of mammal-rich Lagerstätten:
 John Day Formation, Duchesnean to Hemingfordian
 Clarno Formation, Bridgerian to Duchesnean
 Crooked River caldera, Crook County, Oregon

Sources

Notes

References

Bibliography 

 
    
 
 
 
 
 
 

Permian geology of Oregon
Permian System of North America
Cisuralian North America
Sakmarian
Artinskian Stage
Roadian
Wordian
Kungurian
Limestone formations of the United States
Sandstone formations of the United States
Reef deposits
Shallow marine deposits
Permian northern paleotemperate deposits
Paleontology in Oregon
Formations